Petrolia is an unincorporated community in Humboldt County, California,  northeast of Cape Mendocino, at an elevation of  above sea level, within ZIP Code 95558, and area code 707. Petrolia was the site of the first oil well drilled in California.

Description
Petrolia has an estimated population of 300-500 people within a 15-mile radius.  It is located in the Mattole Valley, part of the Lost Coast region, one of the largest wilderness areas and the longest stretch of undeveloped coastline in the continental United States.  Petrolia's isolation is due to its position on the rocky, treacherous coastline adjacent to the  King Range mountains that isolate this area from mainland California and continue to leave the area almost completely undeveloped.

A travel magazine has called this area "too lovely to be believed, perhaps too beautiful to last." It has been recognized as the top "still wild" place in California.  The area is the only significant stretch of California without a shoreline highway, and so far has "thus escaped tourism's aggressive paws."

The  of steep roadways beneath the King Range Mountains include towering Douglas-firs, a few coastal redwoods around the upper reaches of the Mattole River, rocky shorelines, and black sand beaches, as well as a menagerie of fauna, including black bears, black-tailed deer, river otter, California quail, bobcat and porcupine, reptiles such as rattlesnakes, western fence lizards and alligator lizards, various amphibians and bald eagles.

Petrolia has been described as "a river valley town with Norman Rockwell flavor." The Mattole River is home to a variety of California wildlife, including river otters, steelhead trout, more than 250 bird species, and a threatened salmon that was the subject of a book about the community's attempts over two decades to preserve the Mattole salmon. It is one of the few remaining areas with virgin old-growth stands of Douglas-fir.

Geography and climate

Petrolia is located near the Mendocino Triple Junction, where three fault lines meet, and experiences frequent earthquake activity.  The last large earthquake to affect the area was a magnitude 7.1 earthquake in 1992, which resulted in a fire that destroyed the Petrolia General Store.  The store was rebuilt but lacks the charm of the 100-year-old landmark  that it replaced.  Two of the remaining landmarks in Petrolia are a small wooden church dating from 1912—St. Patrick's Catholic Church—and the Petrolia Pioneer Cemetery, which has the graves of original residents of Petrolia dating from November 1857.

On the evening of March 9, 2014, a magnitude 6.9 earthquake struck approximately 50 miles to the west. It was widely felt, yet caused little to no damage, nor did it generate a tsunami. The lack of any significant damage or land deformation was attributed to the shallow strike-slip fault movement in deep (3000m) water. In 2010 two other large quakes had hit the area, a 6.5 on January 9 and a 5.9 on February 3; neither caused any deaths, but the January quake was reported to have caused damage throughout the area.

The weather in Petrolia is temperate. The town is located in a banana belt that is sheltered from the fog that reaches Eureka and some of the northern towns, such as Arcata and McKinleyville.

There are only two roads that lead into Petrolia, one from the north from Ferndale, California, and one from the south from Honeydew, California, leading through scenic redwood forests that were the site for the filming of Jurassic Park and After Earth. Both roads are winding, steep, and sometimes unpaved, passing large tracts of scenic overlooks and wilderness areas.  They are popular routes for visitors, especially mountain bikers and motorcyclists, and have been described as leading to "an almost comically steep drop to the sea".  The road from Petrolia to Ferndale follows the ocean and has unbroken vistas of rocky ocean coastline and beach. Petrolia is surrounded by large tracts of original homestead ranches and farms.

The Mattole area, particularly the Lost Coast beaches, which feature tide pools, pristine beaches and relatively deserted hiking trails, is popular with visitors.  At certain times of year, migrating gray whales can be seen from shore, as well as colonies of harbor seals and sea lions.  Local residents use the Mattole River for swimming, rafting, canoeing, kayaking and catch and release fly fishing. The South Cape Mendocino State Marine Reserve and Sugarloaf Rock are immediately offshore and are closed to public access.

History
The area was originally settled by the Mattole, a Pacific Coast Athapaskan people, who arrived at the Pacific Coast late in the first millennium from what is now Canada.

The Mattole were slaughtered by the Western settlers, mainly oil prospectors and ranching homesteaders. The last remaining descendants of the Mattole live today in Bear River on the Rohnerville Rancheria, but there are no remaining native speakers of the Mattole language.  There are estimated to be more than 80 archeological sites of significance in the Lost Coast area.

Although it's often stated that Petrolia was first named "New Jerusalem," that area is 4–5 miles upstream; however, many people like the holy connotations of being called something like paradise. Petrolia was the site of the first oil well drilled in California.  The oil lay in small, fractured underground pools and ultimately, attempts to extract it dried up; the site is now registered as California Historical Landmark #543.

The Mattole post office opened in 1863, and changed its name to Petrolia in 1865.  A 1903 fire wiped out many buildings around the town square.

On March 9, 2020, a magnitude 5.8 earthquake occurred 86 km West of the city.  The official time of the earthquake was 02:59:06 (UTC). 2660 people reported effects from the earthquake.

Economy 
Local businesses include a bed and breakfast, an organic vineyard and winery, and an organic pick-it-yourself blueberry farm.

Petrolia has an abundance of marijuana growers. Marijuana has long since replaced the ranching and logging that sustained the original residents for generations.

Petrolia has a small general store that sells groceries and has one gas pump.

Government

State and federal 

Facilities
It has a post office and a volunteer fire department.  The original bell cast in 1871 for the Mattole School is still located at the school.

There are two community centers, the Mattole Valley Community Center (originally the school house from 1907 and moved across the street) that hosts community cabaret and gatherings, and the Mattole Grange, an indoor and outdoor gathering area approximately five miles south of Petrolia that hosts a monthly pancake breakfast and farmers' market.  There are community gardens, and various community clubs.
The vault is one of several across the U.S. and is similar to Trementina Base. Prior to construction of this vault, on June 12, 1986, one of the oldest houses in the Petrolia area was deliberately burned by the Church of Spiritual Technology to clear the way for their construction, and symbols were cut in the ground above the vault to mark its location.

Inhabitants
A number of writers and artists have made their home in Petrolia, including Alexander Cockburn, a left-wing journalist and founder of CounterPunch, Dale Maharidge, a journalist and winner of the Pulitzer Prize, Freeman House, an environmental author, Peter Hannaford, an author and political public relations specialist, Jim Danisch, a potter and sculptor, Jenny Scheinman, renowned violinist, Lisa Jo Jones, renowned actor, and Matteo Giglioli, Italian-American political scientist and author.

Petrolia has a large population of environmental activists and hosts two environmental organizations, the Mattole Salmon Group  and the Mattole Restoration Council, both dedicated to preserving the local wildlife and environment.

Culture
The Mattole Valley Historical Society holds occasional public meetings in Petrolia and conducts community walking tours, slideshows and talks about the history of the area and its founders.

Community events including all-ages sporting events, town-wide talent shows, pancake breakfasts, and community meet-ups. In July of each year, the area hosts a music festival called "Roll on the Mattole", at the Mattole Grange, sponsored by the Honeydew Volunteer Fire Company. Twice a year, barbecues at the Mattole Grange attract families from all over the area;  the July 4th and Labor Day weekend annual barbecues features an enormous barbecue pit of local beef and baked beans cooked in a vintage pot so large that they must be stirred with a canoe paddle. There are horse races in September, cycling tours in May–September, including a cycling/hiking tour of the Redwoods  and the Tour of the Unknown Coast, a one-hundred mile bike race beginning and ending in Ferndale. A race called the "Rye and Tide" combines bicycling and running from downtown Petrolia along Lighthouse Road  to the ocean.

Because of its isolation, the Mattole Valley has cultivated a reputation for independence and self-sustenance, including a network of local resources—the maintenance of its own emergency help line (augmenting 9-1-1).

See also
 Operation Green Sweep

References

External links
Lost Coast Wilderness Area
Lost Coast Trail
Humboldt Music Calendar
Mattole Wildlands Defense Blog
McHugh, Paul, Way off the beaton track / Lost Coast road offers rugged fun, SF Gate, 27 June 2002, accessdate 15 January 2013.
Barnes, Amy, John McAbery carves out a life on the Lost Coast, SF Gate, 8 April 2012, accessdate 15 January 2013.
https://www.topic.com/the-silver-currency-of-cannabis-country

Populated coastal places in California
Unincorporated communities in Humboldt County, California
Unincorporated communities in California